(R)-p-Isothiocyanatobenzoylecgonine methyl ester (p-ISOCOC) is a cocaine analogue and irreversible (covalent) binding inhibitor of the cocaine receptor, as well as irreversible blocker of dopamine uptake by DAT (the latter being unlike its C3 homologue m-Isococ). p-Isococ also blocks the high-affinity cocaine site in preference to the low-affinity site.

See also 
 RTI-76, covalent binding phenyltropane
 4'-Fluorococaine

References 

Tropanes
Dopamine reuptake inhibitors
Stimulants
Local anesthetics
Methyl esters
Isothiocyanates
Covalent inhibitors